The concerto transcriptions of Johann Sebastian Bach date from his second period at the court in Weimar (1708–1717). Bach transcribed for organ and harpsichord a number of Italian and Italianate concertos, mainly by Antonio Vivaldi, but with others by Alessandro Marcello, Benedetto Marcello, Georg Philipp Telemann and the musically talented Prince Johann Ernst of Saxe-Weimar. It is thought that most of the transcriptions were probably made in 1713–1714. Their publication by C.F. Peters in the 1850s and by Breitkopf & Härtel in the 1890s played a decisive role in the Vivaldi revival of the twentieth century.

Johann Sebastian Bach was a court musician in Weimar from 1708 to 1717. He wrote most, if not all, of his concerto transcriptions for organ (BWV 592–596) and for harpsichord (BWV 592a and 972–987) from July 1713 to July 1714. Most of these transcriptions were based on concertos by Antonio Vivaldi. Other models for the transcriptions included concertos by Alessandro Marcello, Benedetto Marcello, Georg Philipp Telemann and Prince Johann Ernst of Saxe-Weimar.

Around 1715 Johann Bernhard Bach, Johann Sebastian's second cousin, copied 12 of the concerto transcriptions in a single manuscript. This manuscript, shelf mark P 280 in the Berlin State Library, starts with the harpsichord transcriptions BWV 972–981, followed by the organ transcription BWV 592, and ends with BWV 982. The sequence of the concertos in this manuscript is possibly as intended by the composer. For the organ transcriptions there is no known sequence that may go back to Bach's time.

History, purpose, transmission and significance

Bach's concerto transcriptions reflect not only his general interest in and assimilation of musical forms originating in Italy, in particular the concertos of his Venetian contemporary Antonio Vivaldi, but also the particular circumstances of his second period of employment 1708–1717 at the court in Weimar.

During his first brief period in Weimar in 1703 Bach was employed as a court violinist for seven months by Johann Ernst III, Duke of Saxe-Weimar, who ruled jointly with his elder brother Wilhelm Ernst, Duke of Saxe-Weimar. Wilhelm Ernst's Lutheran piety contrasted with his younger brother's alcoholism. On Johann Ernst's death in 1707, he was succeeded as coregent by his elder son Ernst August, who lived  with his younger stepbrother, Prince Johann Ernst, outside the ducal Wilhelmsburg in the Rotes Schloss. A talented amateur musician, from an early age Prince Johann Ernst had been taught the violin by the court violinist Gregor Christoph Eilenstein. Johann Ernst studied the keyboard with Bach's distant cousin Johann Gottfried Walther, after he became organist at the Stadtkirche in Weimar in 1707. The following year, when Bach himself was appointed as organist in  Weimar in the ducal chapel or Himmelsburg, he not only had at his disposal the recently renovated chapel organ but also the organ in the Stadtkirche. In the Wilhelmsburg, Wilhelm Ernst had already revived the court orchestra, of which Bach eventually became Concertmaster in 1714. As well as music-making in the Wilhelmsburg, Bach was almost certainly involved in the parallel more secular musical events in the Rotes Schloss organised by August Ernst and Johann Ernst. Harpsichords were available to Bach at both venues.

 traces the influences on Bach's early keyboard compositions—in particular his sonatas (BWV 963/1, BWV 967) and toccatas (BWV 912a/2, BWV 915/2)—not only to the works of his older compatriots Kuhnau, Böhm and Buxtehude, but also to the works of Italian composers from the end of the seventeenth century; in particular the chamber sonatas of Corelli and the concertos of Torelli and Albinoni.

Early works like BWV 912a and BWV 967, probably composed before 1707, also display concerto-like elements. The first documented evidence of Bach's engagement with the concerto genre can be dated to around 1709, during his second period in Weimar, when he made a hand copy of the continuo part of Albinoni's Sinfonie e concerti a 5, Op. 2 (1700). Earlier compositions had been brought back to Weimar from Italy by the deputy Capellmeister, Johann Wilhelm Drese, during his stay there in 1702–1703. In 1709 the virtuoso violinist Johann Georg Pisendel visited Weimar: he had studied with Torelli and is likely to have acquainted Bach with more of the Italian concerto repertoire. In the same year Bach also copied out all the parts of the double violin concerto in G major, TWV 52:G2, of Georg Philipp Telemann, a work that he might have acquired through Pisendel. Bach would also have known Telemann well then since he was court musician at Eisenach, Bach's birthplace. Telemann also had a documented social connection with Bach: in March 1714 he was godparent at the baptism in Weimar of Bach's second son Carl Phillip Emanuel.

Later in July 1713, Prince Johann Ernst returned from Utrecht after studying there for 2 years.  A keen amateur violinist, he is likely to have brought or sent back concerto scores from Amsterdam, probably including the collection L'estro armonico, Op.3 of Vivaldi, published there in 1711. Once back in Weimar, he studied composition with Walther, concentrating on the violin concerto. In July 1714, however, poor health forced him to leave Weimar to seek medical treatment in Bad Schwalbach: he died a year later at the age of nineteen. A number of his concertos were published posthumously by Telemann.

Johann Ernst's enthusiasm for the concerto fitted well with Bach's own interests. It was under these circumstances that Bach, as composer and performer, made his virtuosic concerto transcriptions for organ (BWV 592–596) and for harpsichord (BWV 972–987 and BWV 592a). Although Bach served as Concertmaster in Weimar from 1714–1717, when he is presumed to have composed his own instrumental concertos, the only surviving works in Italian concerto-form from this period are his transcriptions of works by other composers. Of these, the main body were by Vivaldi, with others by Telemann, Alessandro and Benedetto Marcello and Johann Ernst himself. At the same time, Bach's cousin Walther also made a series of organ transcriptions of Italian concertos: in his autobiography, Walther mentions 78 such transcriptions; but of these only 14 survive, of concertos by Albinoni, Giorgio Gentili, Giulio Taglietti,  Telemann, Torelli and Vivaldi. Bach and Walther arranged different sets of concertos: Bach favoured the more recent ritornello form, less prevalent in the earlier concertos transcribed by Walther.

 has given the following explanation for the transcriptions:

Schulze has further suggested that during his two year period studying in the Netherlands, Prince Johann Ernst is likely to have attended the popular concerts in the Niewe Kerk in Amsterdam where the blind organist Jan Jakob de Graaf performed his own transcriptions of the most recent Italian concertos.
It is possible that this could have led to Johann Ernst to suggest similar concerto transcriptions to Bach and Walther. Other circumstantial evidence concerning music-making in Weimar is provided by a letter written by Bach's pupil Philipp David Kräuter in April 1713.  Asking for permission to stay longer in Weimar, he states that Prince Johann Ernst,

Kräuter's letter ties in with the organ repairs by Trebs made between June 1713 and May 1714. Commentators have found Schulze's arguments persuasive, but nevertheless point out that not all the transcriptions need have been made in the period from July 1713 to July 1714 when the Prince was back in Weimar. While this could be true for the simpler harpsichord transcriptions, some of the more virtuosic organ transcriptions could date from later, possible composed as a memorial to the prince, after his untimely death.

Published records of Bach's life include his Nekrolog or obituary, written in 1754 by his son Carl Philipp Emanuel Bach and former pupil Johann Friedrich Agricola, and the 1802 biography of Johann Nikolaus Forkel. The Nekrolog contains the famous statement about the Duke, Wilhelm Ernst, encouraging Bach as an organist-composer, quoted at the start of this section. In the often quoted passage from his biography, Forkel wrote:

Although Forkel's account is generally acknowledged to be oversimplified and factually inaccurate, commentators agree that Bach's knowledge and assimilation of the Italian concerto form—which happened partly through his transcriptions—played a key role in the development of his mature style. In practical terms, the concerto transcriptions were suitable for performance in the different venues in Weimar; they would have served an educational purpose for the young prince as well as giving him pleasure.

 has carried out a systematic study of headings and markings in surviving manuscripts to ascertain the intended instrument for Bach's keyboard works. These have customarily been divided into two distinct groups, his works for organ and his works for harpsichord or clavichord. Although in early music the intended instrument was often not specified, but left to the performer, this was often not the case with Bach's music. Based on known manualiter settings within Bach's works for organ, the possible audience for performances of virtuosic keyboard compositions and the circumstances of their composition, Marshall has suggested that the concerto transcriptions BWV 972–987 might originally have been intended as manualiter settings for the organ.

The reception of the concerto transcriptions is reflected in their transmission: they were less widely disseminated than Bach's original organ or keyboard works and were only published in the 1850s during the mid-nineteenth century Bach revival. More significantly perhaps, the concerto transcriptions played a decisive role in the Vivaldi revival which happened only in the following century. The meteoric success of Vivaldi in the early eighteenth century was matched by his descent into almost complete oblivion soon after his death in 1741. In Great Britain, France and particularly his native Italy, musical taste turned against him and, when he was remembered, it was just through salacious anecdote. Only in Northern Germany, where his concertos had influenced a school of composers, was his legacy properly appreciated. The publication of Bach's transcriptions has been recognized by Vivaldi scholars as a decisive step in his revival. In fact the new edition of the concerto transcriptions published by the Bach-Gesellschaft in the 1890s and the ensuing controversy in assessing their authorship and that of the original concertos in the 1910s sparked a reevaluation of Vivaldi and subsequently the rediscovery of his "lost" works.

Although no precise dating of the concerto transcriptions is possible, combining a careful scientific analysis of surviving manuscripts—including their watermarks—with a knowledge of documented events in Bach's life has given a clearer idea of when they might have been written: it is generally thought that most were probably written in the period 1713–1714, but that some could have been written later.  The transcriptions themselves became known through a variety of sources. The two most significant for dating purposes are the autograph manuscript of the organ transcription BWV 596; and the hand copies of the organ transcription BWV 592 and the harpsichord transcriptions BWV 972–982 made by Bach's second cousin Johann Bernhard Bach from Eisenach, who is known to have visited Weimar in May 1715. These include all the transcriptions of the Venetian concertos (those by Vivaldi and the Marcello brothers). The remaining organ transcriptions come from copies made in Leipzig by Bach's family and circle: these include his eldest son Wilhelm Friedemann Bach, whose organ repertoire included the transcriptions; his pupil Johann Friedrich Agricola; and Johann Peter Kellner. The other harpsichord transcriptions BWV 983–987 are contained in a collection of manuscripts of Kellner ("Kellner's Miscellany"), copied by himself and others.

Bach's transcriptions

Organ transcriptions, BWV 592–596

These transcriptions for organ have been dated to 1713–1714. They are scored for two manual keyboards and pedal.

Concerto in G major, BWV 592 

This concerto is a transcription of a concerto by Prince Johann Ernst of Saxe-Weimar.

Concerto in A minor, BWV 593

This concerto is a transcription of Antonio Vivaldi's double violin concerto, Op. 3 No. 8, RV 522.

Concerto in C major, BWV 594

This concerto is a transcription of Antonio Vivaldi's Grosso Mogul violin concerto, RV 208.

Concerto in C major, BWV 595

This concerto movement is a transcription of a composition by Prince Johann Ernst of Saxe-Weimar.

Concerto in D minor, BWV 596

This concerto is an transcription of Antonio Vivaldi's double violin concerto, Op. 3 No. 11, RV 565.

 [Allegro] 
 Pieno. Grave – Fuge
 Largo e spiccato
 [Allegro]

This transcription of Vivaldi's concerto had the heading on the autograph manuscript altered by Bach's son Wilhelm Friedemann Bach who added "di W. F. Bach manu mei Patris descript" sixty or more years later. The result was that up until 1911 the transcription was misattributed to Wilhelm Friedemann. Despite the fact that Carl Friedrich Zelter, director of the Sing-Akademie zu Berlin where many Bach manuscripts were held, had suggested Johann Sebastian as the author, the transcription was first published as a work by Wilhelm Friedemann in 1844 in the edition prepared for C.F. Peters by Friedrich Griepenkerl. The precise dating and true authorship was later established from the manuscript: the handwriting and the watermarks in the manuscript paper conform to cantatas known to have been composed by Bach in Weimar in 1714–1715.

The autograph manuscript is remarkable for its detailed specifications of organ registration and use of the two manuals. The markings are also significant for what they show about performance practise at that time: during the course of a single piece, hands could switch manuals and organ stops could be changed.

Harpsichord transcriptions, BWV 592a and 972–987

Concerto in G major, BWV 592a

After a concerto by Prince Johann Ernst of Saxe-Weimar, and Bach's earlier organ transcription, BWV 592.

Concerto in D major, BWV 972

After Violin Concerto in D major Op. 3 No. 9, RV 230, by Antonio Vivaldi. There is an early version of the transcription, BWV 972a.

Concerto in G major, BWV 973

After Violin Concerto in G major, RV 299, by Antonio Vivaldi.

Concerto in D minor, BWV 974

After Oboe Concerto in D minor by Alessandro Marcello.

Concerto in G minor, BWV 975

After Violin Concerto in G minor, RV 316, by Antonio Vivaldi.

Concerto in C major, BWV 976

After Violin Concerto in E major Op. 3 No. 12, RV 265, by Antonio Vivaldi.

Concerto in C major, BWV 977

After an unidentified model.

Concerto in F major, BWV 978

After Violin Concerto in G major Op. 3 No. 3, RV 310, by Antonio Vivaldi.

Concerto in B minor, BWV 979

After Violin Concerto in D minor, RV 813, by Antonio Vivaldi (formerly RV Anh. 10 attributed to Giuseppe Torelli).

Concerto in G major, BWV 980

After Violin Concerto in B-flat major, RV 383 by Antonio Vivaldi.

Concerto in C minor, BWV 981

After 12 Concerti à cinque, Op. 1, No. 2 in E minor, by Benedetto Marcello.

Concerto in B-flat major, BWV 982

After Violin Concerto in B-flat major Op. 1 No. 1 by Prince Johann Ernst of Saxe-Weimar.

Concerto in G minor, BWV 983

After an unidentified model.

Concerto in C major, BWV 984

After the Violin Concerto in C major by Prince Johann Ernst of Saxe–Weimar (like BWV 595).

Concerto in G minor, BWV 985

After the Violin Concerto in G minor, TWV 51:g1, by Georg Philipp Telemann.

Concerto in G major, BWV 986

After an unidentified model.

Concerto in D minor, BWV 987

After Concerto Op. 1 No. 4 by Prince Johann Ernst of Saxe-Weimar.

Models and comments
There are, or have been, attribution issues regarding some of the models Bach used for his keyboard transcriptions:
 The model for BWV 974 has been attributed to Antonio Vivaldi, Benedetto Marcello and Alessandro Marcello. In the second half of the 20th century the oboe concerto which was the model for Bach's transcription became attributed to Alessandro Marcello again —as it had been in its 1717 printed edition— through research of scholars such as Eleanor Selfridge-Field.
 The model for BWV 979 has been attributed to Vivaldi and to Giuseppe Torelli. Listed as No. 10 in the Anhang (Appendix) of the Ryom-Verzeichnis (RV), it was generally attributed to Torelli. Federico Maria Sardelli argued against the attribution to Torelli, and in favour of an attribution to Vivaldi, in an article published in 2005. Consequently, the concerto was relisted as RV 813. The composition originated before 1711: for instance its seven movements and its second viola part are not compatible with Vivaldi's later style.
 No models have been identified for BWV 977, 983 and 986. Stylistically BWV 977 is more Italianate than BWV 983 and 986. David Schulenberg supposes an Italian model for BWV 977, and German models for the other two concertos.

After Vivaldi
Bach transcribed seven concertos by Antonio Vivaldi for solo harpsichord (RV 230, 265, 299, 310, 316, 381 and 813), and three for solo organ (RV 208, 522 and 565).

From L'estro armonico
Bach transcribed two concertos of Antonio Vivaldi's Op. 3, L'estro armonico for organ (BWV 593 and 596), and three concertos of that collection for unaccompanied harpsichord (BWV 972, 976 and 978):
 After Vivaldi's Op. 3 No. 3 (Violin Concerto in G major, RV 310): Concerto in F major, BWV 978
 After Vivaldi's Op. 3 No. 8 (Concerto in A minor for two violins and strings, RV 522): Concerto in A minor, BWV 593 
 After Vivaldi's Op. 3 No. 9 (Violin Concerto in D major, RV 230): Concerto in D major, BWV 972, and earlier version BWV 972a
 After Vivaldi's Op. 3 No. 11 (Concerto in D minor for two violins, cello and strings, RV 565): Concerto in D minor, BWV 596
 After Vivaldi's Op. 3 No. 12 (Violin Concerto in E major, RV 265): Concerto in C major, BWV 976 
Later Bach would arrange Vivaldi's Op. 3 No. 10 (RV 580) to a concerto for four harpsichords and strings (BWV 1065).

Concertos circulating as manuscript
Bach realised his other transcriptions of concertos by Vivaldi after versions circulating as manuscript. Later versions of some of these concertos by Vivaldi were published in his Op. 4 and 7:
 After Vivaldi's Violin Concerto in B-flat major (later version published as Op. 4 No. 1, RV 383a): Concerto in G major, BWV 980 (harpsichord)
 After Vivaldi's Violin Concerto in G minor, RV 316 (later version published as Op. 4 No. 6, RV 316a): Concerto in G minor, BWV 975 (harpsichord)
 After Vivaldi's Violin Concerto in G major (later version published as Op. 7 No. 8, RV 299): Concerto in G major, BWV 973 (harpsichord)
 After Vivaldi's Violin Concerto Grosso Mogul in D major, RV 208 (later version published as Op. 7 No. 11, RV 208a): Concerto in C major, BWV 594 (organ)
 After Vivaldi's Violin Concerto in D minor, RV 813 (formerly RV Anh. 10 often attributed to Torelli): Concerto in B minor, BWV 979 (harpsichord)

After other Venetian composers
Apart from the concertos after models by Antonio Vivaldi (including one formerly attributed to Torelli), Bach also transcribed concertos by the Venetian brothers Alessandro and Benedetto Marcello. Benedetto was a more prolific composer than his elder brother Alessandro.

Benedetto Marcello's Op. 1 No. 2
Benedetto Marcello's Op. 1, containing twelve concerti à cinque, was published in 1708. The second concerto in that collection, in E minor, had a violino principale in its first two movements.
 BWV 981 – Concerto in C minor, after Benedetto Marcello's Concerto Op. 1 No. 2

Alessandro Marcello's Oboe concerto

Bach based his transcription of Marcello's oboe concerto on a lost manuscript that was circulating before the concerto was published in 1717.
 BWV 974 – Concerto in D minor, after Alessandro Marcello's Oboe Concerto in D minor

After Telemann
BWV 985 is a Concerto in G minor for unaccompanied harpsichord, after Georg Philipp Telemann's .

BWV Anh. 213 is a lost Concerto in F major for solo organ, after an unidentified concerto by Georg Philipp Telemann.

After Prince Johann Ernst of Saxe–Weimar
Prince Johann Ernst of Saxe-Weimar's Op. 1 was published posthumously, some time after Bach had provided solo harpsichord arrangements for two out of six concertos contained in that bundle:
 After Johann Ernst's Op. 1 No. 1: Concerto in B-flat major, BWV 982 
 After Johann Ernst's Op. 1 No. 4: Concerto in D minor, BWV 987

Concerto in G major, after Johann Ernst's :
 BWV 592: pedaliter version
 BWV 592a: manualiter version

Concerto in C major after Johann Ernst's :
 BWV 984: harpsichord version
 BWV 595: organ version (first movement only)

After unidentified models
There is no extant model for a few of Bach's concerto transcriptions for harpsichord:
 BWV 977 – Concerto in C major
 BWV 983 – Concerto in G minor
 BWV 986 – Concerto in G major

Notes

References

Sources
 Introduction (in German and English) • Commentary (English translation—commentary in paperback original is in German)
 
 

 
]

 
 

, Updates (2016)

 

 (a reprint of a 1985 publication in Early Music)

Further reading
 Sarah Elizabeth Hanks. The German Unaccompanied Keyboard Concerto in the Early 18th Century: Including Works of Walther, Bach, and Their Contemporaries. University of Iowa, 1972 (dissertation).
 Federico Maria Sardelli. "Le opere giovanili di Antonio Vivaldi", pp. 45–78” in Studi vivaldiani 5, 2005. 
 Jean-Claude Zehnder. "Giuseppe Torelli und Johann Sebastian Bach: Zu Bachs Weimarer Konzertform", pp. 33–95 in Bach-Jahrbuch 77, edited by Hans-Joachim Schulze and Christoph Wolff. Merseburger, 1991.

Manuscripts
 25448 MSM at Conservatoire royal de Bruxelles: Fascicles 3 (BWV 972a) and 4 (BWV 981) at Bach Digital website
 D-LEb Peters Ms. 8 at /Bach Archive: Fascicles 28 (BWV 984) and 29 (BWV 981) at Bach Digital website
 D-LEb Peters Ms. 11 at /Bach Archive: (BWV 592; D-LEb Peters Ms. 11 at Bach Digital website)
 D-LEm Poel. mus. Ms. 29 at Bach Digital website)
 D-LEu N.I.5137 and 5138 at Leipzig University Library (BWV 594; RISM Nos. 200020992 and 200020991; D-LEu N.I.5137 and 5138 at Bach Digital website)
 Mus.ms. Bach P 280 at Berlin State Library (BWV 592 and 973–982; ; D-B Mus. ms. Bach P 280 at Bach Digital website)
 Mus.ms. Bach P 286 at Berlin State Library: Fascicles 6 (BWV 595) and 7 (BWV 594) at Bach Digital website
 Mus.ms. Bach P 330 at Berlin State Library (Bach's autograph of BWV 596; ; D-B Mus. ms. Bach P 330 at Bach Digital website)
 Mus.ms. Bach P 400b and 400c at Berlin State Library (BWV 593 and 594; RISM Nos. 467300036 and 467300037; D-B Mus. ms. Bach P 400b and 400c at Bach Digital website)
 Mus.ms. Bach P 801 (28) at Berlin State Library ("Concerto di Marcello", BWV 981; ; D-B Mus. ms. Bach P 801, Fascicle 28 at Bach Digital website)
 Mus.ms. Bach P 804 at Berlin State Library: Fascicles 4 (BWV 974), 15 (BWV 976), 28 (BWV 985), 31 (BWV 592), 34 (BWV 987), 35 (BWV 983), 46 (BWV 986), 52 (BWV 984), 54 (BWV 973), 55 (BWV 972) and 56 (BWV 977) at Bach Digital website

External links
 At IMSLP website:
BWV 592 and BWV 592a: Violin Concerto in G major (Johann Ernst Prinz von Sachsen-Weimar)
Organ Concerto in A minor, BWV 593 (Bach, Johann Sebastian) and Concerto for 2 Violins in A minor, RV 522 (Vivaldi, Antonio)
Organ Concerto in C major, BWV 594 (Bach, Johann Sebastian)
Organ Concerto in C major, BWV 595 (Bach, Johann Sebastian) and Violin Concerto in C major (Johann Ernst Prinz von Sachsen-Weimar)
Organ Concerto in D minor, BWV 596 (Bach, Johann Sebastian) and Concerto in D minor, RV 565 (Vivaldi, Antonio)
16 Konzerte nach verschiedenen Meistern, BWV 972–987 (Bach, Johann Sebastian), Violin Concerto in D major, RV 230 (Vivaldi, Antonio), Violin Concerto in G major, RV 299 (Vivaldi, Antonio), Oboe Concerto in D minor, S.Z799 (Marcello, Alessandro), Violin Concerto in G minor, RV 316a (Vivaldi, Antonio), Violin Concerto in E major, RV 265 (Vivaldi, Antonio), Violin Concerto in G major, RV 310 (Vivaldi, Antonio), Violin Concerto in B-flat major, RV 383a (Vivaldi, Antonio) and Violin Concerto, TWV 51:g1 (Telemann, Georg Philipp)
12 Concerti Grossi, Op.1 (Marcello, Benedetto), L'estro armonico, Op.3 (Vivaldi, Antonio), La stravaganza, Op.4 (Vivaldi, Antonio), 12 Concerti, Op.7 (Vivaldi, Antonio) and 12 Concerti a 5 (Various)

Concertos by Johann Sebastian Bach
Compositions by Johann Sebastian Bach